Amalda monilifera is a species of sea snail, a marine gastropod mollusk in the family Ancillariidae.

References

monilifera
Gastropods described in 1864